Desmond Brathwaite (died 10 April 2022) was a Saint Lucian politician who was Minister for Sport and who represented Castries South Constituency in the Saint Lucia House of Assembly from 1987 to 1997 for the United Workers Party.

References 

20th-century births
2022 deaths
People from Castries Quarter
Government ministers of Saint Lucia
Members of the House of Assembly of Saint Lucia
United Workers Party (Saint Lucia) politicians
Year of birth missing